Ernest Butler Rowley (15 January 1870 – 4 October 1962) was an English cricketer.

Rowley was educated at Clifton College and Oriel College, Oxford. He became a solicitor and public notary. active from 1893 to 1898 who played for Lancashire. He was born and died in Manchester. He appeared in 17 first-class matches as a righthanded batsman, scoring 586 runs with a highest score of 65 and held four catches.

Notes

1870 births
1962 deaths
English cricketers
Lancashire cricketers
Oxford University Past and Present cricketers
People educated at Clifton College
Alumni of Oriel College, Oxford